Dead Still is a six-part Irish-Canadian television drama series, which premiered on May 18, 2020 on Acorn TV and May 15, 2020 Citytv. The series is a co-production between Ireland's Deadpan Pictures and Canada's Shaftesbury Films and is written by John Morton, from a story by John Morton and Imogen Murphy, and directed by Imogen Murphy and Craig David Wallace.

In 2021 Dead Still was nominated for 7 IFTAs at the 17th Irish Film & Television Awards, including Best Drama and Best Director.

Premise
Dead Still follows Brock Blennerhasset, a well regarded photographer in 1880s Ireland who specialises in memorial portraiture – photographing the recently deceased – as he is drawn into a series of murders which appear to be linked to his work.

Cast
 Michael Smiley as Brock Blennerhasset
 Aidan O'Hare as Frederick Regan, an officer of the D.M.P.
 Eileen O'Higgins as Nancy Vickers, Brock's niece and an aspiring actress
 Kerr Logan as Conall Malloy, a gravedigger and Brock's assistant
 Jimmy Smallhorne as Cecil Carruthers
 Mark Rendall as Percy Cummins
 Martin Donovan as Bushrod Whacker
 Aoife Duffin as Betty Regan
 Peter Campion as Henry Vickers
 Rhys Dunlop as Ronnie Roper
 Fiona Bell as Abigail Vickers
 Gemma-Leah Devereux as Hanna Dubby
 Patrick FitzSymons as William Glendinning
 Jordanne Jones as Lily Molloy
 Laura Murray as Eva Lambert / The Ghost Queen
 Mary Murray as Aline Lambert
 Lynn Rafferty as Bessie Bulger
 Shane Lennon as Harry Farrelly
 John Morton as Ossie Burke
 Natalia Cooper as Vicenta

Episodes

References

External links
 
 
 

2020 Irish television series debuts
2020s Irish television series
2020 Canadian television series debuts
2020s Canadian crime drama television series
Irish crime television series
Citytv original programming
Television series by Shaftesbury Films